Yevgenyevka may refer to:
Yevgenyevka, Kazakhstan, a city in the Almaty Province, Kazakhstan
Yevgenyevka, Russia, name of several rural localities in Russia